The 2nd New York Regiment was authorized on May 25, 1775, and formed at Albany from June 28 to August 4 for service with the Continental Army under the command of Colonel Goose Van Schaick. The enlistments of the first establishment ended on December 31, 1775.

The second establishment of the regiment was authorized on January 19, 1776.  

The regiment would see action in the Invasion of Canada, Battle of Valcour Island, Battle of Saratoga, Battle of Monmouth, the Sullivan Expedition and the Battle of Yorktown. The regiment would be furloughed, June 2, 1783, at Newburgh, New York and disbanded November 15, 1783.

Footnotes

References
 Fernow, Berthold, New York in the Revolution, 1887
 Heitman, Francis B., Historical Register of Officers of the Continental Army during the War of the Revolution. New, enlarged, and revised edition., Washington, D.C.: Rare Book Shop Publishing Company, 1914
 Wright, Robert, The Continental Army, 1983

External links
Bibliography of the Continental Army in New York compiled by the United States Army Center of Military History

2nd New York Regiment